Polilio may refer to:

 Polillo Islands, an island group in Quezon Province, the Philippines
 Polillo Island, the main island of the Polillo Island Group
 Polillo, Quezon, a municipality on the island
 Polillo Strait, a strait of water separating the Polillo Islands from Luzon Island